Odette Talazac (1883–1948) was a French film actress.

Talazac was the daughter of tenor Jean-Alexandre Talazac and his wife, the soprano Hélène Fauvelle. She began her career singing in music halls before turning to the theater and cinema. She was married in 1900 in Chatou to jeweler Georges Aucoc.

Selected filmography
 Two Timid Souls (1928)
 The Queen's Necklace (1929)
 Figaro (1929)
 The Blood of a Poet (1930)
 The Man at Midnight (1931)
 Der Kongreß tanzt (1931)
 The Nude Woman (1932)
 The House on the Dune (1934)
 George and Georgette (1934)
 Antonia (1935)
 Madame Angot's Daughter (1935)
 Anne-Marie (1936)
 Nights of Fire (1937)
 The Alibi (1937)
 Southern Mail (1937)
 The Lafarge Case (1938)
 Gibraltar (1938)
 Latin Quarter (1939)
 The White Slave (1939)
 Sowing the Wind (1944)
 Happy Go Lucky (1946)
 Rendezvous in Paris (1947)

References

Bibliography
 Capua, Michelangelo. Anatole Litvak: The Life and Films. McFarland, 2015.

External links

1883 births
1948 deaths
French film actresses
French silent film actresses
20th-century French actresses
Actresses from Paris